Kiekko-Espoo is a Finnish ice hockey club founded in 1984. Kiekko-Espoo men's team plays in the Mestis and the women's team plays in the Naisten Liiga. Kiekko-Espoo's junior teams play at national league levels in U16, U18 and U20 juniors. The junior teams of Espoo Blues and Kiekko-Espoo played under Kiekko-Espoo Juniorit ry until 2014.

The team plays in U16, U18 and U20 junior leagues under the name Kiekko-Espoo. When Espoo United collapsed in the spring of 2018, the organization decided to also establish a representative team for adults in Kiekko-Espoo. It started playing in the 2018–2019 season in the Suomi-sarja. In the 2019–2020 season, the Blues women's representative team also moved to Kiekko-Espoo.

History

Establishment of Kiekko Espoo 
On February 15, 1984, Espoon Palloseura and  merged into Kiekko-Espoo and inherited Jäähonka's place in the 2. Divisioona. K-Espoo's first arena was the Matinkylä Ice Hall.

Espoo Blues (1998–2016) 

Kiekko-Espoo's name changed to Espoo Blues in the summer of 1998. The renamed team played the first half of the 1998–1999 season in the Helsinki Ice Hall, because the Matinkylä Ice Hall no longer met the requirements of the SM-liiga. Länsiauto-arena was completed in January 1999 as the new home arena of the Espoo Blues.

The district court of Espoo declared the club's background company Jääkiekko Espoo Oy bankrupt on March 21, 2016. The company's biggest creditors were the Finnish Tax Administration and the pension insurance company , who had applied for Blues's bankruptcy already in November 2015. In April 2016, the total amount of the club's debts was made public at almost 4 million euros. After the bankruptcy decision, the Blues announced that the activities of the club's A-juniors will continue until the end of the current season. Blues's A-juniors played the playoffs of the U20 SM-sarja and the team made it to the finals. In the final, Blues lost to Ilves.

Re-establishment of Kiekko-Espoo 
Kiekko-Espoo was re-established in 2018. The new Kiekko-Espoo played its first season in Suomi-sarja  Kiekko-Espoo will try to enter Liiga in the 2024–2025 season.

Kiekko-Espoo made it to the Mestis finals in the 2021–22 season but lost to Imatran Ketterä in 5 games.

Honours

Liiga 
 Runner-up (2) 2007–08, 2010–11

Mestis 
 Runner-up (1) 2021–22

Finnish Cup 
 Winner (1): 2022 
 Runner-up (1): 2021

Notes

References 

Liiga teams
1984 establishments in Finland
Ice hockey clubs established in 1984
Ice hockey teams in Finland